Peter Gerald Sullivan (born July 25, 1951) is a Canadian former professional ice hockey centre who played for the Winnipeg Jets.

Early life 
As a youth, he and teammate Mike Murphy played in the 1963 Quebec International Pee-Wee Hockey Tournament with a minor ice hockey from North York.

Career 
During his career, Sullivan played 126 games in the National Hockey League and 313 games in the World Hockey Association.

Personal life 
Sullivan's father, Frank, won a gold medal for Canada in ice hockey at the 1928 Winter Olympics and a Grey Cup championship for the Toronto Argonauts in 1921.

Career statistics

Regular season and playoffs

References

External links
 

1951 births
Living people
Canadian ice hockey centres
Genève-Servette HC players
Moncton Golden Flames players
Montreal Canadiens draft picks
Muskegon Mohawks players
Nova Scotia Voyageurs players
Oshawa Generals players
Peterborough Petes (ice hockey) players
SC Bern players
SC Langenthal players
SC Langnau players
Ice hockey people from Toronto
Suncoast Suns (EHL) players
Winnipeg Jets (1979–1996) players
Winnipeg Jets (WHA) players
Wichita Wind players